Meharrize (also transliterated Mheiriz, Mehaires; Arabic: محيرس) is an oasis located in Western Sahara. It is situated between Tifariti and Amgala, 93 km from  Smara, to the east of the Moroccan Wall, and in the Polisario Front-held part of Western Sahara close to the Mauritanian border. It has a dispensary, a school, and a mosque. Also, it is the head of the 4th military region of the Sahrawi Arab Democratic Republic.

Infrastructure
During late June 2012, the Sahrawi minister of Construction and Urbanization of the Liberated Territories visited the town to supervise the  family farms project and the construction of a school, opened in 2013.

Politics
On June 17, 2007, the Polisario Front celebrated here the 37th anniversary of the Sahrawi uprising in 1970, the Zemla Intifada.

Culture
In August 2008, Mheiriz hosted the III edition of the Summer University, for the Sahrawi students abroad. The students visited the historical archaeological sites in the region and profited from many conferences and lectures on different themes, such as religion, culture and security, in addition to other activities such as film projections and expositions.

Twin towns - Sister cities

  Berantevilla, Álava, Basque Country, Spain
  Carranza, Biscay, Basque Country, Spain
  Firenzuola, Florence, Tuscany, Italy
  Lezama, Biscay, Basque Country, Spain
  Markina, Biscay, Basque Country, Spain
  Soria, Soria, Castilla y León, Spain (since May 8, 2008)

References

Oases of Western Sahara
Populated places in Western Sahara
Sahrawi Arab Democratic Republic